Kevin Connolly may refer to:

Kevin Connolly (actor) (born 1974), American actor
Kevin Michael Connolly (born 1985), American photographer
Kevin Connolly (writer) (born 1962), Canadian poet, editor and critic
Kevin M. Connolly (born 1974), American voice actor
Kevin J. Connolly, British psychologist
Kevin Connolly (racehorse trainer) in 1990 Epsom Derby
Kevin Connolly, a BBC News reporter

See also
Kevin Connelly, comedian
Kevin Conolly, an Australian politician